Nikola Živković (1792–1870), known as Hadži-Neimar (Хаџи-Неимар), was the chief builder during the first reign of Serbian Prince Miloš Obrenović (1817–39). Born in Voden (now Edessa, Greece) in 1792, he likely was schooled in Thessaloniki or Athens, where he had relatives. It is unknown when he moved to Serbia. His wife, Kostadinka Karkaljer, was from Magarevo (now North Macedonia). He had four daughters and a son. He died at Belgrade in 1870.

A construction worker and contractor by trade, he became Obrenović's chief builder, entrusted with building all governmental- and royal buildings between 1820 and 1850. He is sometimes called an architect, although it remains unknown if there was an actual architect behind the works. The most notable buildings are Princess Ljubica's Residence and Residence of Prince Miloš.

References

19th-century Serbian people
Architecture in Serbia
Principality of Serbia
1792 births
1870 deaths
People from Edessa, Greece
Serbian people of Greek descent